The Bosses is a 1973 album by American blues shouter "Big Joe" Turner accompanied by a small group led by Count Basie, recorded in 1973 and released on the Pablo label.

Reception

An Allmusic review by Scott Yanow awarded the album 4 stars and stated that it was one of Turner's better late-period albums, and that he was on top form on "Night Time Is the Right Time," "Wee Baby Blues" and "Roll 'Em Pete".

Track listing
 "The Honeydripper" (Joe Liggins) - 6:42
 "Honey Hush" (Nat King Cole, Big Joe Turner, Lou Willie Turner) - 2:37
 "Cherry Red" (Pete Johnson, Big Joe Turner) - 4:42
 "Night Time Is the Right Time" (Leroy Carr, Lew Herman) - 3:54
 "Blues Around the Clock" (Willie Bryant) - 4:58
 "Since I Fell for You" (Buddy Johnson) - 3:55
 "Flip, Flop and Fly" (Chuck Calhoun, Lou Willie Turner) - 3:28
 "Wee Baby Blues" (Johnson, Big Joe Turner) - 5:37
 "Good Morning Blues" (Count Basie, Eddie Durham, Jimmy Rushing) - 3:50
 "Roll 'Em Pete" (Johnson, Turner) - 4:16

Personnel
Big Joe Turner - vocals
Count Basie - piano
Ray Brown - double bass
Irving Ashby - guitar
Eddie "Lockjaw" Davis - tenor saxophone
Zoot Sims
J.J. Johnson - trombone
Harry "Sweets" Edison - trumpet
Louie Bellson - drums

References

Pablo Records albums
Albums produced by Norman Granz
Count Basie albums
Big Joe Turner albums
1973 albums